Coleus amboinicus, synonym Plectranthus amboinicus, is a semi-succulent perennial plant in the family Lamiaceae with a pungent oregano-like flavor and odor. Coleus amboinicus is considered to be native to parts of Africa, the Arabian Peninsula, and India, although it is widely cultivated and naturalized elsewhere in the tropics where it is used as a spice and ornamental plant. Common names in English include Indian borage, country borage, French thyme, Indian mint, Mexican mint, Cuban oregano, soup mint, Spanish thyme. The species epithet, amboinicus refers to Ambon Island, in Indonesia, where it was apparently encountered and described by João de Loureiro (1717–1791).

Description 
Old stems are smooth (glabrescent). 

The margins are coarsely crenate to dentate-crenate except in the base. They are thickly studded with hairs (pubescent), with the lower surface possessing the most numerous glandular hairs, giving a frosted appearance. The aroma of the leaves can be described as a pungent combination of the aromas of oregano, thyme, and turpentine. The taste of the leaves is described as being similar to the one of oregano, but with a sharp mint-like flavor.

Flowers are on a short stem (shortly pedicelled), pale purplish, in dense 10-20 (or more) flowered dense whorls (cymes), at distant intervals, in a long slender spike-like raceme. Rachis , fleshy and pubescent. Trumpet-like widened; limb 2-lipped, upper lip short, erect, puberulent, lower lip long, concave. Filaments are fused below into a tube around the style. 

The seeds (nutlets) are smooth, pale-brown, roundish flattened, c. .<ref>Flora Malesiana, Vol. 8, by Steenis, C. G. G. J. van (Cornelis Gijsbert Gerrit Jan); Steenis-Kruseman, M. J. van; Indonesia. Departemen Pertanian; Lembaga Ilmu Pengetahuan Indonesia; Kebun Raya Indonesia,  Publication date 1950, p. 387. Available on https://archive.org/details/floramalesiana83stee.</ref>

Distribution and habitatColeus amboinicus is native to Southern and Eastern Africa, from South Africa (KwaZulu-Natal) and Eswatini to Angola and Mozambique and north to Kenya and Tanzania, where it grows in woodland or coastal bush, on rocky slopes and loamy or sandy flats at low elevations.Flora Malesiana, Vol. 8, by Steenis, C. G. G. J. van (Cornelis Gijsbert Gerrit Jan); Steenis-Kruseman, M. J. van; Indonesia. Departemen Pertanian; Lembaga Ilmu Pengetahuan Indonesia; Kebun Raya Indonesia,  Publication date 1950, p. 387. Available on https://archive.org/details/floramalesiana83stee. From Southern Africa it would have been carried by Arabs and other traders to Arabia, India and Southeast Asia along the Indian Ocean maritime trade routes. The plant also currently grows in mainland India. The plant was later brought to Europe, and then from Spain to the Americas, hence the name Spanish thyme.

Research
In basic research, the effects of the essential oil were tested with other plant essential oils for possible use as a mosquito repellant.

Uses
The leaves are strongly flavoured. The herb is used as a substitute for oregano to mask the strong odors and flavors of fish, mutton, and goat. Fresh leaves are used to scent laundry and hair. It is also grown as an ornamental plant.The Herbalist in the Kitchen, by Gary Allen, University of Illinois Press, 2010, p. 198.

Phytochemicals
The main chemical compounds found in the essential oil of Coleus amboinicus are carvacrol (28.65%), thymol (21.66%), α-humulene (9.67%), undecanal (8.29%), γ-terpinene (7.76%), p-cymene (6.46%), caryophyllene oxide (5.85%), α-terpineol (3.28%), and β-selinene (2.01%). Another analysis obtained thymol (41.3%), carvacrol (13.25%), 1,8-cineole (5.45%), eugenol (4.40%), caryophyllene (4.20%), terpinolene (3.75%), α-pinene (3.20%), β-pinene (2.50%), methyl eugenol (2.10%), and β-phellandrene (1.90%). The variations can be attributed to the methodology used in the extraction process, seasonal variations, soil type, climate, genetic and geographical variations of the plant.

 Cultivation Coleus amboinicus is a fast-growing plant commonly grown in gardens and indoors in pots. Propagation is by stem cuttings, but it can also be grown from seeds. In dry climates the herb grows easily in a well-drained, semi-shaded position. It is frost tender (USDA hardiness zones 10–11) and grows well in subtropical and tropical locations, but will do well in cooler climates if grown in a pot and brought indoors, or moved to a warm, sheltered position in winter. In Hawaii and other humid tropical locations, the plant requires full sun. It can be harvested throughout the growing season to be used fresh, dried, or frozen.

 Common names 
 Cuban oregano
 Country borageTropicos, http://www.tropicos.org/Name/17602719, accessed 21 August 2012
 French thyme
 Indian borage
 Mexican mint (US, favored common name)
 Orégano francés (in Cuba and other Spanish language sources)
 Pudina (in Trinidad and Tobago, Guyana and Suriname by the Indian population)
 Soup mint
 Spanish thyme
 Oregano brujo (witch oregano) in Puerto Rico
 Thick leaf thyme or broad leaf thyme

 Gallery 

See also
 Hedeoma patens, Spanish common name  ('small oregano')

References 

amboinicus
Plants described in 1825
Flora of Africa
Herbs
Plants used in traditional African medicine
Leaf vegetables